Ardvreck School is an independent boarding and day preparatory school for boys and girls aged 3–13, located in Crieff in Perth and Kinross, Scotland. It was established in 1873.

Notable former pupils

Rear-Admiral Hugh Balfour (1933-1999), senior Royal Navy officer.
Jonathan Hammond (born 1980), British sport shooter and Commonwealth Games gold medalist.
Major General George Henry Inglis (1902-1979), senior British Army officer.
James Provan (born 1936), farmer and politician.
Ivor Ramsay (1902-1956), Anglican priest.

References

External links
Ardvreck School
Ardvreck School's page on Scottish Schools Online
Profile on the Independent Schools Council website
Profile on the Good Schools Guide

Boarding schools in Perth and Kinross
Educational institutions established in 1883
Private schools in Perth and Kinross
Preparatory schools in Scotland
1883 establishments in Scotland
Crieff